The Dolan Fire was a large wildfire that burned in the Big Sur region and other parts of the Santa Lucia mountain range in Monterey County, California, in the United States as part of the 2020 California wildfire season. The fire began at approximately 8:15 p.m. on August 18, 2020. On September 8, 15 firefighters were injured, one critically, when they were forced to deploy emergency fire shelters at Nacimiento Station. Ten adult California condors and two chicks died in the blaze, which began about a mile south of the Big Sur Condor Sanctuary in Monterey County. The nonprofit Ventana Wildlife Society of Monterey lost a sanctuary that has been used to release the captive-bred condors into the wild since 1997. While no people or condors were at the  site, a research building, pens, and other facilities were destroyed.

The fire burned parts of the Ventana Wilderness, Fort Hunter Liggett, along Nacimiento-Fergusson Road, and forced the closure of many area state parks as well as a section of California State Route 1. As of December 31, 2020, the fire has been fully contained. According to the D.A, the estimated cost of fighting the fire was $63 million.

The Dolan fire was started by arson, and Ivan Gomez was arrested in connection with the fire and convicted of arson subsequent to his confession and conviction. Gomez claimed he lit the fire to hide five murders, but his mental competency, the true intentionality of the arson, and the actual existence of bodies were put in question. On September 23, 2020, a judge ruled that he was competent to stand trial. He was convicted in April 2022 of 16 felony counts, including arson and cruelty to animals. In May 2022, he was sentenced to 24 years in state prison.

See also 
 2020 California wildfires

References

2020 California wildfires
Wildfires in San Luis Obispo County, California
Wildfires in Monterey County, California
California wildfires caused by arson
August 2020 crimes in the United States